This is a largely incomplete list of Statutory Instruments made in the United Kingdom in the year 2014.

1-100

101-200

Other
SI 1398/2014 - The Flexible Working Regulations 2014, which came into force on 30th June 2014.
SI 2559/2014 - The Equality Act 2010 (Equal Pay Audits) Regulations 2014, requiring an employment tribunal to order an employer to carry out an equal pay audit after a finding that there has been as equal pay breach.

See also

List of Acts of the Parliament of the United Kingdom, 2000–present#2014

Notes

References

Law of the United Kingdom
2014 in British law
2014 in British politics
Lists of Statutory Instruments of the United Kingdom